Jakubsonia is an extinct genus of early tetrapod from the Late Devonian of Russia. The type species, Jakubsonia livnensis, was described and named in 2004.

References 

Prehistoric tetrapod genera
Devonian tetrapods
Ichthyostegalia
Prehistoric tetrapods of Asia
Basal tetrapods of Europe
Fossil taxa described in 2004
Extinct animals of Russia